The 2012 Skyrunner World Series was the 11th edition of the global skyrunning competition, Skyrunner World Series, organised by the International Skyrunning Federation from 2002. 

From this edition there is a new format: three different categories and four different champions including the overall champion.

Results

Category SkyRace

Category Ultra

Category Vertical Kilometer

Combined ranking

References

External links
 Skyrunner World Series

2012